The Clean Energy Act 2011 was an Act of the Australian Parliament, the main Act in a package of legislation that established an Australian emissions trading scheme (ETS), to be preceded by a three-year period of fixed carbon pricing in Australia designed to reduce carbon dioxide emissions as part of efforts to combat global warming.

The package was introduced by the Gillard Labor Government in February 2011 and was repealed by the Abbott Government on 17 July 2014, backdated to 1 July 2014.

History

Rudd Government
The Gillard Labor Government's legislation followed unsuccessful efforts by the Rudd Labor Government to secure passage of an ETS through the Australian Parliament. In opposition, Rudd had called climate change "the greatest moral, economic and social challenge of our time" and called for a cut to greenhouse gas emissions by 60% before 2050. Both the incumbent Howard Government and the Rudd Labor opposition promised to implement an ETS before the 2007 federal election. Labor won the election, and the Rudd government began negotiating the passage of an ETS through Parliament.

The Opposition led by Brendan Nelson called for the vote on the government's ETS be delayed until after the United Nations climate change summit in Copenhagen in December 2009. Rudd said in response that it would be "an act of absolute political cowardice, an absolute failure of leadership not to act on climate change until other nations had done so" and the government pursued the early introduction of the Scheme.

Choosing not to negotiate with the Australian Greens, who did not hold the balance of power in the Senate, the government entered negotiations with the new Liberal Opposition Leader, Malcolm Turnbull, and in the lead up to the Copenhagen Conference, developed an amended Carbon Pollution Reduction Scheme (CPRS), with the support of Turnbull. Following a party revolt by Coalition members opposed to the Scheme, and shortly before the carbon vote, Tony Abbott challenged for the leadership of the Liberal Party and narrowly defeated Turnbull. Thereafter the Coalition opposed the ETS outright and the government was unable to secure the support of any other senators for its CPRS.

Abbott described Rudd's Emission Trading plan as a "Great big tax on everything" and opposed it. Abbott announced a new Coalition policy on carbon emission reduction in February, which committed the Coalition to a 5% reduction in emissions by 2020. Abbott proposed the creation of an 'emissions reduction fund' to provide 'direct' incentives to industry and farmers to reduce carbon emissions.

Following the unsuccessful Copenhagen Conference, Rudd announced the deferral of the Scheme and elected not to take the matter to a double dissolution election. In June 2010, Rudd was replaced as leader of the Labor Party in an internal party leadership challenge and Julia Gillard became Prime Minister. Factional leader and key Gillard supporter Bill Shorten said that the sudden announcement of change of policy on the CPRS was a factor that had contributed to a collapse in support for Rudd's leadership.

Gillard Government

Following her election as party leader, in various policy announcements in the lead up to the 2010 election, Prime Minister Gillard and Treasurer Wayne Swan gave assurances that no carbon tax would be introduced by a Gillard led government, but that a "citizens' assembly" would be called to sound out public support for a price on carbon.

The 2010 election resulted in a hung parliament in which Gillard secured the support of the Greens and three independents to form a government. On 28 September, in a joint press conference with the Greens, Gillard announced that a citizens assembly would not be held and that instead a "multi-party climate change committee" consisting of Labor, Greens and Independent members, would examine the issues.

On 24 February 2011, in a joint press conference of the "Climate Change Committee" – comprising the Government, Greens and two independent MPs – Gillard announced a plan to legislate for the introduction of a fixed price to be imposed on "carbon pollution" from 1 July 2012 The carbon price would be placed for three to five years before a full emissions trading scheme is implemented, under a blueprint agreed by a multi-party parliamentary committee. Key issues remained to be negotiated between the Government and the cross-benches, including compensation arrangements for households and businesses, the carbon price level, the emissions reduction target and whether or not to include fuel in the tax.

The Gillard Government proposed the Clean Energy Bill in February 2011, which the opposition claimed was a broken election promise. The legislation was approved by the House of Representatives in October 2011 and by the Senate in November 2011. The Liberal Party vowed to overturn the legislation if elected.

Mechanism

The Act begins on 1 July 2012, and operates on a financial year basis. It is administered by the Clean Energy Regulator and the responsible Minister.  A carbon pollution cap limits the sum of: (a)     the total number of auctioned carbon units; and (b)     the total number of free carbon units issued in accordance with the Jobs and Competitiveness Program; and (c)  the total number of free carbon units issued to coal-fired electricity generators. If a person (including a corporation) is responsible for covered emissions of greenhouse gas from the operation of a facility, the facility's annual emissions are above a threshold, and the person does not surrender one eligible emissions unit for each tonne of carbon dioxide equivalence of the gas, the person is liable to pay unit shortfall charge. The financial years beginning on 1 July 2012, 1 July 2013 and 1 July 2014 are fixed charge years (otherwise known in popular terms as the 'carbon tax').  In a fixed charge year, carbon units will be issued under the Act for a fixed charge. Later financial years are flexible charge years which involve emissions trading. In a flexible charge year, carbon units will be issued under the Act as the result of an auction plus by means of free allocation to coal fired generators and emissions-intensive trade-exposed (EITE) industries. However, in the flexible charge years beginning on 1 July 2015, 1 July 2016 and 1 July 2017, some carbon units may be issued for a fixed charge (to act as a cap). Furthermore, free carbon units will be issued under the Jobs and Competitiveness Program (which deals with emissions-intensive trade-exposed (EITE) activities).  Free carbon units will be issued to coal-fired electricity generators. If a carbon unit was not issued for a fixed charge, the unit is transferable. The Climate Change Authority will conduct periodic reviews of the Act.

Impacts 
Under the scheme, around 500 entities will be required to buy permits for each tonne of CO2 emitted. Personal income tax will be reduced for those who earn less than $80,000 per year and the tax-free threshold increased from $6,000 to $18,200. In February 2012, the Sydney Morning Herald reported that Clean Energy Future carbon price had not deterred new investment in the coal industry, as spending on exploration had increased by 62 percent in 2010–2011, more than any other mineral commodity. The government agency Geoscience Australia reported that investment in coal prospecting reached $520 million in 2010–2011.

See also

Climate change in Australia
Economics of climate change mitigation
List of climate change initiatives

References

External links
Text of the Bill
 [Full text of Act at Austlii http://www.austlii.edu.au/au/legis/cth/consol_act/cea2011119/index.html Full text of Act at Austlii]

Sustainable energy
Environmental law in Australia
2011 in Australian law
2011 in the environment
Gillard Government
Acts of the Parliament of Australia